The 1915–16 Georgetown Hoyas men's basketball team represented Georgetown University during the 1915-16 NCAA college basketball season. John O'Reilly coached the team in his second season as head coach. Georgetown was an independent and played its home games at Ryan Gymnasium on the Georgetown campus in Washington, D.C., and finished the season with a record of 9-6.

Season recap
Georgetown defeated crosstown rival George Washington twice this season, giving the Hoyas a four-game winning streak against George Washington dating to the previous season. The streak would reach 19 wins before George Washington suspended the series after the 1923-24 season.

Roster
Sources

Georgetown players did not wear numbers on their jerseys this season. The first numbered jerseys in Georgetown mens basketball history would not appear until the 1933-34 season.

1915–16 schedule and results
Sources

|-
!colspan=9 style="background:#002147; color:#8D817B;"| Regular Season

References

Georgetown Hoyas men's basketball seasons
Georgetown
Georgetown Hoyas men's basketball team
Georgetown Hoyas men's basketball team